Ching Hong Aik (born 30 November 1973) is a Malaysian former footballer.

Ching is one of the veterans and surviving players since the semi-professional era and fully fledged with Negeri Sembilan FA ever since. The hard working defender was one of former youth players for Malacca FA but moved to their neighbour for a successful career and became one of the most consistent players with Negeri Sembilan FA under different coaches.

He won the 2005/06 Malaysia Super League and 2005 Malaysia Premier League.

He moved to Sarawak FA for one season but returned to Negeri Sembilan FA and has since become one of the most experienced defenders with his age.

Ching moved to Muar Municipal Council FC in 2011, along with his teammate from Negeri Sembilan, Sani Anuar Kamsani. He retired at the end of the 2011 season.

References

External links
 Malaysian Super League Info
 

Malaysian footballers
Malaysian people of Chinese descent
1973 births
Living people
People from Malacca
Association football defenders
Negeri Sembilan FA players